Diego Aracena International Airport  is an airport serving Iquique, capital of the Tarapacá Region in Chile. It shares a runway with Los Cóndores Air Base (Base Aérea Los Cóndores), home to the First Air Brigade of the Chilean Air Force (Fuerza Aérea de Chile).

The Diego Aracena non-directional beacon (Ident: R) is located on the field.

Airlines and destinations

Passenger

Cargo

See also
Transport in Chile
List of airports in Chile

References

External links
Diego Aracena International Airport at OpenStreetMap
Diego Aracena International Airport at OurAirports

Airports in Tarapacá Region